Orbit One Zero is a BBC Radio science fiction programme written by Peter Elliott Hayes, and starring Felix Felton. A single series consisting of six episodes was produced which aired between 21 April 1961 and 26 May 1961.

Cast 
The four primary characters who appear are:

 Felix Felton as Dr Hayward Petrie
 David Spenser as Tom Lambert
 Graydon Gould as Clifford Brown
 Elaine MacNamara as Elizabeth Ryder

Plot
Journalist Tom Lambert looks into his archives and begins to reinvestigate the events of ten years earlier. The situation involves university professor Dr Petrie inviting two students to an island off the west coast of Scotland named Scara to visit a radio telescope as they investigate strange signals. On the beach of the island, they discover a large cylindrical object, which is then uncovered in an attempt to discover its origin and purpose.

Episodes
Six episodes were produced in a single series:

Broadcast History
The show was originally broadcast on the BBC Home Service. Repeats have since aired on BBC Radio 4 Extra. It has since been made available for listening at archive.org.

References 

BBC Home Service programmes
British science fiction radio programmes